The Marin History Museum is a museum with two locations in Marin County, California, US.  It includes the historic Boyd Gate House, the museum's main exhibition space, in San Rafael, and the Collections Research Facility, in Novato. It is one of about a dozen US museums that has launched a mobile app to view the county's historic hotspots.

References

External links
 Official website

Museums in Marin County, California
Buildings and structures in San Rafael, California
History museums in California